The soundtrack for the film Elizabethtown, directed by Cameron Crowe, constitutes multiple volumes released by RCA Records between 2005-2006. The first volume of original songs from the movie, titled Elizabethtown: Songs from the Motion Picture, was released September 13, 2005. The physical CD release of this first volume remains in print at the time of writing, but is not as pictured here, featuring instead the red cover art seen on AllMusic, and does not include the last song "Plush" referenced by the track listing here. The original score, composed by rock musician Nancy Wilson, was released on October 14, 2005. The four-song extended play Songs for the Ride Home was released as a limited-time iTunes Exclusive on December 20, 2005. A full-length follow-up collection, titled Elizabethtown: Volume 2, was released on February 7, 2006, and replaced Songs for the Ride Home on iTunes 

Overall, the albums featured original music by rock musician Nancy Wilson, as well as songs by Tom Petty, Elton John, Lindsey Buckingham, Ryan Adams, My Morning Jacket, 
Jeff Finlin, and other artists.

Track listing

Volume 1
 "60B (Etown Theme)" – Nancy Wilson
 "It'll All Work Out" – Tom Petty and the Heartbreakers
 "My Father's Gun" – Elton John
 "io (This Time Around)" – Helen Stellar
 "Come Pick Me Up" – Ryan Adams
 "Where to Begin" – My Morning Jacket
 "Long Ride Home" – Patty Griffin
 "Sugar Blue" – Jeff Finlin
 "Don't I Hold You" – Wheat
 "Shut Us Down" – Lindsey Buckingham
 "Let It Out (Let It All Hang Out)" – The Hombres
 "Hard Times (Come Again No More)" – Eastmountainsouth
 "Jesus Was a Cross Maker" – The Hollies
 "Square One" – Tom Petty
 "Same in Any Language" – I Nine
 "Plush" – 13th Step

Songs for the Ride Home

 "Words" – Ryan Adams
 "Jesus Was a Cross Maker" – Rachael Yamagata
 "Oh Yeah" – Nancy Wilson
 "Moon River" – Patty Griffin

Volume 2

 "Learning to Fly" – Tom Petty and the Heartbreakers
 "English Girls Approximately" – Ryan Adams
 "Jesus Was a Cross Maker" – Rachael Yamagata
 "Funky Nassau" – The Beginning of the End
 "Loro" – Pinback
 "Moon River" – Patty Griffin
 "Summerlong" – Kathleen Edwards
 "...Passing By" – Ulrich Schnauss
 "You Can't Hurry Love" – The Concretes
 "River Road" – Nancy Wilson
 "Same in Any Language" – My Morning Jacket
 "What Are They Doing in Heaven Today" – Washington Phillips
 "Words" – Ryan Adams
 "Big Love" (Live)- Lindsey Buckingham
 "I Can't Get Next to You" – The Temptations

Original score

 "60B (Etown Theme)"
 "Same in Any Lingo"
 "Scruffy Busque"
 "River Kiss"
 "River Drive"
 "Headstone"
 "Grey Sky's Blue"
 "Flame to Ashes"
 "Zapata"
 "Dirty Shirt"
 "C Roll"
 "Family Table"
 "Drew's Theme"
 "Telephone Waltz"
 "California Baylor"
 "River Road"
 "Fiasco"
 "Containing Magic"
 "Bicycle Kid"
 "Every Snowflake"
 "Sun on a Rug"

References

Comedy film soundtracks
2005 soundtrack albums
2006 soundtrack albums
RCA Records soundtracks
Rock soundtracks
Pop soundtracks
Alternative country albums by American artists
Albums produced by Cameron Crowe